Brian Hodge is a prolific writer in a number of genres and subgenres, as well as an avid connoisseur of music.  He lives in Boulder, Colorado, where he is working on his latest novel.

Brian Hodge's novels are often dark in nature, containing themes such as self-sacrifice.  He often explores unique belief systems in his stories.

He has been nominated for numerous awards, and won the International Horror Guild Award for best short fiction.

Bibliography

Novels
 Dark Advent (Pinnacle, 1988) 
 Oasis (Tor Books, 1989) 
 Nightlife (Dell, 1991) 
 Deathgrip (Dell, 1992, paperback and Delirium Books, 2005, hardcover) 
 The Darker Saints (Dell, 1993) 
 Prototype (Dell, 1996, and Delirium Books, 2007, hardcover) 
 Wild Horses (William Morrow & Co., 1999, hardcover and Ballantine, 2000, paperback) 
 Hellboy: On Earth As It Is In Hell (Pocket Books, 2005) 
 World of Hurt (Earthling Publications, 2006) 
 Mad Dogs (Cemetery Dance Publications, 2007) 
 Dawn of Heresies (Onyx Path Publishing, 2016)
 The Immaculate Void (ChiZine Publications, 2018

Novellas and novelettes
 Without Purpose, Without Pity (Delirium Books, 2012)
 Whom The Gods Would Destroy (Darkfuse, 2013)
 Dark City: A Novella Collection (with Gerard Daniel Houarner) (Necro Publications, 2015)
 The Weight of the Dead (Tor Books, 2016)
 I'll Bring You the Birds From Out of the Sky (Cemetery Dance Publications, 2017)

Short fiction collections
 Shrines & Desecrations (TAL Publications, 1994)
 The Convulsion Factory (Silver Salamander, 1996)
 Falling Idols (Silver Salamander, 1998)
 Lies & Ugliness (Night Shade Books, 2002)
 World of Hurt (Earthling Publications, 2006)
 Picking the Bones (Cemetery Dance Publications, 2011)
 Skidding Into Oblivion (ChiZine Publications, 2019)

Convention appearances
World Horror Convention '93, '96, '99, and '00.  Death Equinox '97, '98, '99, and '01. Brian was the Horrific Literatist GoH at Death Equinox '97, and a Veteran GoH for each following year.

References

External links
 
 

20th-century American novelists
21st-century American novelists
American crime fiction writers
American horror writers
American male novelists
Living people
Novelists from Colorado
20th-century American male writers
21st-century American male writers
Year of birth missing (living people)
Weird fiction writers